Lukáš Daněk (born 19 September 1997) is a Czech Nordic combined skier. He competed in the 2018 Winter Olympics and the 2022 Winter Olympics.

References

1997 births
Living people
Nordic combined skiers at the 2018 Winter Olympics
Nordic combined skiers at the 2022 Winter Olympics
Czech male Nordic combined skiers
Olympic Nordic combined skiers of the Czech Republic
People from Jilemnice
Sportspeople from the Liberec Region